"Don't Take My Boop-Oop-A-Doop Away" is a song, written by Sammy Timberg.

It was first recorded for the short film Musical Justice, with a vocal by Mae Questel. It was then used in the 1932 Betty Boop Talkartoons cartoon Boop-Oop-a-Doop. The chorus follows as:
You can feed me bread and water,
Or a great big bale of hay,
But don't take my boop-oop-a-doop away!;
You can say my voice is awful,
Or my songs are too risqué.
Oh, but don't take my boop-oop-a-doop away!,

The word "boop-oop-a-doop" is considered nonsensical, but it can have a risqué meaning. For example, in the Boop-Oop-a-Doop cartoon, it is thought that the word is used as a substitute for "virginity".

See also
 Musical Justice (1931)
 Boop-Oop-a-Doop

References

External links 
Dont Take My Boop Oop a Doop away at IMDB
Dont take my Boop oop a Doop away at Heptune
Dont take my Boop oop a Doop away at the Internet Archive
BoopoopADooin The Songs of Sammy Timberg at Scribd

Animated series theme songs
Songs about language
1931 songs
Betty Boop
Songs written for films